Planning Policy Statement 6: Planning for Town Centres (PPS 6) is a document produced by the British Government to advise Local planning authorities on planning for the future of town centres. The current version was introduced in March 2005 and replaced Revised PPG 6: Town Centres and Retail Developments (published 1996) and subsequent policy statements.

See also 
Planning Policy Statements
Town and country planning in the United Kingdom
Planning and Compulsory Purchase Act 2004

References 

United Kingdom planning policy